Lajayang is a village in Mohnyin Township, Mohnyin District, Kachin State, Myanmar.

References 

Populated places in Kachin State